Trương Đình Luật (born 12 November 1983) is a Vietnamese professional footballer.

Honours

Club
Becamex Bình Dương
 V.League 1:
 Winners : 2014, 2015
 Vietnamese National Cup
 Winners : 2015
 Runners-up :2014
 Vietnamese Super Cup
 Winners : 2014, 2015
Mekong Club Championship
 Winners : 2014

International
Vietnam
AFF Championship
Semi-finalists : 2014, 2016
 AYA Bank Cup 
 Winners :: 2016

References

External links 

1983 births
Living people
People from Nghệ An province
Vietnamese footballers
Association football defenders
Vietnam international footballers
V.League 1 players
Xuan Thanh Saigon Cement FC players
Becamex Binh Duong FC players
Navibank Sài Gòn FC players
Footballers at the 2006 Asian Games
Asian Games competitors for Vietnam